Pascale Gruny (born 18 February 1960) was a member of the National Assembly of France.  She represented the Aisne department, and is a member of the Union for a Popular Movement.

She is a former Member of the European Parliament (MEP) elected in the 2009 European election for the North-West constituency.

References

1960 births
Living people
People from Cambrai
Politicians from Hauts-de-France
The Social Right
The Republicans (France) politicians
Deputies of the 12th National Assembly of the French Fifth Republic
Deputies of the 13th National Assembly of the French Fifth Republic
French Senators of the Fifth Republic
Senators of Aisne
Union for a Popular Movement MEPs
MEPs for North-West France 2009–2014
21st-century women MEPs for France
20th-century French women politicians
Women members of the National Assembly (France)
Women members of the Senate (France)
Chevaliers of the Légion d'honneur